Henri Cole (born 1956) is an American poet, who has published many collections of poetry and a memoir. His books have been translated into French, Spanish, Italian, German, and Arabic.

Biography
Henri Cole was born in Fukuoka, Japan, to an American father and French-Armenian mother, and raised in Virginia, United States.  His father, a North Carolinian, enlisted in the service after graduating from high school and, while stationed in Marseilles, met Cole's mother, who worked at the PX.  Together they lived in Japan, Germany, Illinois, California, Nevada, Missouri and Virginia, where Cole attended public schools and the College of William and Mary.  He has published ten collections of poetry in English.

From 1982 until 1988 he was executive director of The Academy of American Poets. 
Since that time he has held many teaching positions and been artist-in-residence at various institutions, including Brandeis University, Columbia University, Davidson College, Harvard University, Ohio State University, Reed College, Smith College, The College of William and Mary, and Yale University.  He has collaborated with the visual artists Jenny Holzer and Kiki Smith.  And from 2010 to 2014, he was poetry editor of The New Republic.  Cole currently teaches at Claremont McKenna College.

Books of poetry
 2023: Gravity and Center (Selected Sonnets, 1994-2022), New York: Farrar, Straus & Giroux
 2021: Der sichtbare Mensch (Ausgewählte Gedicht), (German translation by Hans Raimund), Vienna: Löcker
 2020: Blizzard, New York: Farrar, Straus & Giroux
 2015: Nothing to Declare, New York: Farrar, Straus & Giroux
 2015: Le Merle, Le Loup suivi de Toucher (French translation by Claire Malroux), Paris: Le bruit du temps
 2011: Touch, New York: Farrar, Straus & Giroux
 2011: Terre Médiane (French translation by Claire Malroux), Paris: Le bruit du temps
 2010: Mirlo y Lobo (Spanish translation by Eduardo López Truco), Cantabria: Quálea Editorial
 2010: Autoritratto con Gatti (Italian translation by Massimo Bacigalupo), Parma: Guanda Editore
 2010: Pierce the Skin (Selected Poems, 1982-2007), New York: Farrar, Straus & Giroux
 2008: La Apariencia de la Cosas (Spanish translation by Eduardo López Truco), Cantabria: Quálea Editorial
 2007: Blackbird and Wolf, New York: Farrar, Straus & Giroux
 2005: Vingt-Deux Poèmes (French translation by Claire Malroux), Paris: Yvon Lambert
 2003: Middle Earth, New York: Farrar, Straus & Giroux
 1998: The Visible Man, New York: Farrar, Straus & Giroux
 1995: The Look of Things
 1989: The Zoo Wheel of Knowledge
 1986: The Marble Queen

Books of prose 
 2020: باريس الأورفيّة: السّياحة الأدبية في باريس  (Orphic Paris, Arabic translation by Amani Lazar), United Arab Emirates: Rewayat Books  
 2018: Orphic Paris, New York, New York Review Books
 2018: Paris-Orphée  (French translation by Claire Malroux), Paris: Le bruit du temps

Awards and honors
 2017 — American Academy of Arts and Letters, Elected Member
 2016 — American Academy of Arts and Letters, Award of Merit Medal in Poetry
 2014 — Radcliffe Institute for Advanced Study at Harvard, Fellow
 2012 — The Thom Gunn Award for Poetry for Touch, Publishing Triangle
 2012 — The Jackson Poetry Prize for Touch, Poets & Writers
 2011 — Harvard University Phi Beta Kappa poet
 2011 — Finalist, Los Angeles Times Book Award in Poetry for Pierce the Skin (Selected Poems 1982-2007)
 2010 — American Academy of Arts & Sciences, elected member
 2009 — Sara Teasdale Award in Poetry, Wellesley College
 2009 — National Endowment for the Arts Literature Fellowship 
 2008 — Lenore Marshall Poetry Prize for Blackbird and Wolf, Academy of American Poets 
 2008 — Ambassador Book Award in Poetry for Blackbird and Wolf, English-Speaking Union of the United States
 2008 — Massachusetts Book Award in Poetry for Blackbird and Wolf
 2008 — Lambda Literary Award in Poetry for Blackbird and Wolf
 2007 — United States Artists USA Hildreth/Williams Fellow, Literature
 2004 — Kingsley Tufts Poetry Award for Middle Earth
 2004 — John Simon Guggenheim Memorial Foundation Fellowship
 2004 — Award in Literature, American Academy of Arts and Letters
 2004 — Finalist, Pulitzer Prize in Poetry for Middle Earth
 2004 — Finalist, Los Angeles Times Book Award in Poetry for  Middle Earth
 2004 — Massachusetts Book Award in Poetry for Middle Earth
 2001 — Japan-United States Friendship Commission, Creative Artist Fellowship
 2000 — Berlin Prize, American Academy in Berlin
 1995 — Rome Prize in Literature, American Academy of Arts and Letters
 1993 — National Endowment for the Arts Literature Fellowship
 1989 — Amy Lowell Poetry Travelling Scholarship
 1985 — Ingram Merrill Foundation Award (also 1990)

Personal life 
Cole is openly gay, though in his early work he turned to "nature as a mask for writing about private feelings." He came out as he "felt a need to speak as a gay man, since until recently we were not encouraged by society to love one another, marry, and have children. So if I have an ethics, it is simply to be true, but never at the expense of original language."

References

External links
Official website
 Academy of American Poets -- Henri Cole's webpage
 Twitter -- @ColeHenri
 THE NATION -- "The Art of Violent Concision"
 THE NEW REPUBLIC -- "Making a Soul"
 A personal essay:  "How I Grew"
  An interview:  "What is American about American poetry"

1956 births
American male poets
American writers of Armenian descent
Columbia University staff
Harvard University staff
College of William & Mary alumni
American gay writers
Smith College faculty
Living people
Lambda Literary Award winners
Berlin Prize recipients
American LGBT poets
Gay academics
Members of the American Academy of Arts and Letters
Gay poets